Kimberly Robertson, a.k.a. Kim Sevier, is an American voice actress.  She has done voice work for ADV Films.

Roles
 Blue Seed – Moe Fujimiya, Reiko Kanbayashi
 Burn Up W – Chisato
 Devil Hunter Yohko – Princess Yanagi
 Dirty Pair Flash – Yuri
 Ellica – Maeyard
 Fire Emblem – Shiida
 Golden Boy – Noriko
 Kimera – Kimera
 Neon Genesis Evangelion – Yui Ikari (original dub)
 New Cutie Honey – Golddigger
 Panzer Dragoon – Alita
 Princess Minerva – Blue Morris
 Sol Bianca OVA – April Bikirk
 Those Who Hunt Elves – Gabriella, Skeleton

External links
 Kimberly Robertson's personal website at the Wayback Machine (archived May 13, 2010)

American voice actresses
Living people
1968 births
21st-century American women